Daniel Natou is a Ni-Vanuatu footballer who plays as a midfielder for Solomon Island topclub Solomon Warriors. He also plays for the Vanuatu national football team.

International career

International goals
Scores and results list Vanuatu's goal tally first.

References

External links
 
 

Living people
1989 births
Vanuatuan footballers
Vanuatu international footballers
Solomon Warriors F.C. players
Tafea F.C. players
Nalkutan F.C. players
2016 OFC Nations Cup players
Association football forwards
Vanuatuan expatriate footballers
Expatriate footballers in the Solomon Islands
Vanuatuan expatriate sportspeople in the Solomon Islands